737 Arequipa is a minor planet orbiting the Sun. It was named after the Peruvian city of Arequipa, where Harvard's Boyden Observatory was located prior to 1927.

See also
 List of minor planets/701–800
 Meanings of minor planet names: 501–1000

References

External links
 
 

Background asteroids
Arequipa
Arequipa
S-type asteroids (Tholen)
S-type asteroids (SMASS)
19121207